Dendrobium regium is a species of orchid endemic to India. It has been found in Chhattisgarh, Jharkhand, Orissa, and Andhra Pradesh.

References

External links
IOSPE orchid photos, Dendrobium regium Prain 1902, Photo by © Steven Beckendorf 

regium
Endemic orchids of India
Environment of Andhra Pradesh
Environment of Chhattisgarh
Environment of Jharkhand
Environment of Odisha
Plants described in 1902